The 2013 Major League Lacrosse draft took place on January 10, 2013 in Philadelphia, Pennsylvania.

Draft

Round 1

Round 2

Round 3

Round 4

Round 5

Round 6

Round 7

Round 8

See also
Major League Lacrosse draft

References

Major League Lacrosse draft
Major League Lacrosse
Major League Lacrosse draft